Presidential elections were held in Iran 17 June 2005, with a second round run-off on 24 June. Mohammad Khatami, the previous President of Iran, stepped down on 2 August 2005, after serving his maximum two consecutive four-year terms according to the Islamic Republic's constitution. The election led to the victory of Mahmoud Ahmadinejad, the hardline mayor of Tehran, with 19.48% of the votes in the first round and 61.69% in the second. Factors thought to have contributed to Ahmadinejad's victory include mobilization of mosque networks and conservative/hardline voters, and a protest vote against corrupt elite insiders and for "new political blood". A loyal supporter of conservative Supreme Leader Khamenei, Ahmadinejad kissed the leader's hand during his authorization ceremony. Officials reported a turnout of about 59% of Iran's 47 million eligible voters, a decline from the 63% turnout reported in the first round of balloting a week before.

Schedule
Schedule of the election had been decided between the Ministry of Interior and the Guardian Council for 17 June 2005. The election will continue as a runoff race, which will take place a week later than the first round of elections, on 24 June 2005. The registration of candidates began on 10 May 2005 and continued for five days, until 14 May. If the Guardian Council had requested, it may have been extended for five more days, until 19 May. The candidates were not allowed to do advertisements, until the final list of approved candidates are known. The official period for advertisement was from 27 May to 15 June.

In the first round, Iranian nationals born on or before 17 June 1990, residing in or outside Iran, were able to vote. The election in Iran began on 09:00 local time (04:30 UTC) and while the original deadline was ten hours later on 19:00 (14:30 UTC), the deadline was extended three times by the Ministry of Interior, finally until 23:00 (18:30 UTC). Outside Iran, different times are used as the opening and closing hours for the polling offices. On the same date, mid-term Majlis elections for Gachsaran, Garmsar, Ghazvin, Ilam, Iranshahr, Jolfa, Marand, Sarbaz, and Shiraz took place together with the runoff elections of Tehran for the Iranian Majlis election of 2004.

The first three suggestions by the Ministry, for 13 May, 20 May and 10 June 2005, had been rejected by the council. The Ministry had mentioned that it is concerned that an election later than 20 May may collide with the final exams of the elementary schools and high schools.

The second round of the election occurred on 24 June and Iranian nationals born on or before 24 June 1990 were able to vote. The election in Iran began at 09:00 local time (04:30 UTC) and the closing time of the voting polls was at 19:00 (14:30 UTC), but was subject to extension by the Ministry of Interior.

Candidates
The registration of the candidates finished on 14 May 2005 and 1014 candidates had registered to run, including many people who did not have the qualifications required in the law. More than 90% of the candidates were men, and there were about ninety female candidates. The law about the election process does not include any requirements for people who want to register to run: it only provides qualifications that are to be checked by the Guardian Council.

The candidates must have first be approved by the Guardian Council before being put to public vote and it could be predicted that some of the candidates would not win the approval, especially Ebrahim Asgharzadeh and Ebrahim Yazdi, who were rejected by the Council in the parliamentary elections of 2004 and/or the presidential elections of 2001. There were also some people who expected Mostafa Moeen, the most controversial reformist candidate, to be disqualified as well. But the most unpredictable was the disqualification of conservative Reza Zavare'i, a former member of the Guardian Council and an approved presidential candidate for two previous elections.

Also, there was a high probability of rejection of women, because of an ambiguous term ("rejāl", رجال) in the Constitution of Iran, a requirement for presidential candidates, which may be interpreted as either "men" or "nobles". The Guardian Council, who is also the official interpreter of the constitution, has mentioned on previous elections that the restriction has not been considered in depth yet, since according to the council's opinion there were no women registered to run for presidency who fulfilled the other requirements of the constitution; but still, the Council believes that the requirement of rejal would not match women.

There had also been discussions for a new law proposed in the Majlis, restricting the maximum age of the candidates for the presidential elections. This was widely seen as an attempt to limit the participation of Akbar Hashemi Rafsanjani and Mehdi Karroubi. The attempt failed with no proposal appearing.

Approved candidates
The list of all the people who have officially registered to run for the post is not available to the public, but the Guardian Council published a final list of six approved candidates on 22 May rejecting all independent candidates and some candidates from the both wings, specially the reformist candidates Mostafa Moeen and Mohsen Mehralizadeh. This raised many objections among the general public and the political parties, including student protests in the Tehran University, among other universities. This, and the objections of some of the approved candidates, led to a letter from Ayatollah Khamenei, the Supreme Leader, to the Guardian Council asking for the approval of Moeen and Mehralizadeh (this had apparently been because of a request by Haddad-Adel, the conservative Speaker of the Parliament). It is unknown if that letter meant that the Guardian Council must have approved these two, or it should have only reconsidered their case. The next day, on 23 May, the Guardian Council announced the approval of Moeen and Mehralizadeh.

Mohsen Rezaee, one of the approved conservative candidates, who is the Secretary of Expediency Discernment Council and a previous commander of the Iran–Iraq War, withdrew in the evening of 15 June.

These were the candidates approved by the Council of Guardians:

Trans-party
 Akbar Hashemi Rafsanjani, Chairman of the Expediency Discernment Council and a former President of Iran, who has won the support of several parties from both of the wings (and may still win more support), but is considered to lean towards the conservatives more than towards the reformists. Ironically, the reformist alliance considered him as a possible candidate of theirs more than the conservative alliance. He was invited to run for president by Executives of Construction Party (reformist), Combatant Clergy Association (conservative), Islamic Labour Party (conservative), and Workers' House (reformist), as well as several other parties across the whole spectrum of positions. Rafsanjani confirmed he is running for the election on 10 May after much speculation.

Reformists
Mehdi Karroubi, former Majlis Speaker, Secretary General of Association of Combatant Clerics (MCS), supported by MCS, Islamic Association of Engineers, Majma'-e Gorooh-haa-ye Khat-te Emam, and Democracy Party of Iran.
Mohsen Mehralizadeh, Vice-President and Head of National Sports Organization, member of IIPF. Mehralizadeh has first announced that he would be running for the post on behalf of the Iranian younger generation, but not if the reformist alliance reached consensus on another candidate, but during the registration mentioned that he would remain in the race until the end.
Mostafa Moeen, former Minister of Science, Research and Technology, supported by Islamic Iran Participation Front (IIPF) and Mojahedin of the Islamic Revolution Organization (MIRO). Confirmed to run on 29 December 2004. IIPF, an influential reformist party in Iran, has mentioned that they won't support any presidential candidate outside the party, except Mousavi and Moeen. Since Mousavi has declined to run, they supported Moeen, whom they claimed to be the most probable candidate to win the approval of other parties in the reformist alliance. Some conservative Majlis representatives had asked for the Guardian Council's rejection of Moeen, which happened finally but was reversed after a letter by Ayatollah Khamenei. Moeen had announced that he would choose Mohammad Reza Khatami as his First Vice President if he was elected, and had already chosen Elaheh Koulaee, a female representative of the sixth Islamic Assembly, as his spokeswoman.

Conservatives
Mahmoud Ahmadinejad, Mayor of Tehran, member of Islamic Society of Engineers (ISE), supported by some parts of Alliance of Builders of Islamic Iran (ABII). Although Ahmadinejad said he would not seek nomination on 2 February 2005, he returned to the scene later.
Mohammad Bagher Ghalibaf, former Commander of Police (niroo-ye entezaami), partially supported by the Alliance of Builders. Contrary to the public announcement of Ayatollah Khamenei, the Supreme Leader of Iran, that nobody knows who he will personally vote for, Ghalibaf had claimed privately that he is the person Khamenei will vote for.
Ali Larijani, Supreme Leader's representative in National Security Council and a former director of IRIB, who was supposed to be the major conservative candidate, as chosen by his party, the Islamic Society of Engineers, as well as the "Council for Coordinating the Revolution Forces" (showrā-ye hamāhangi-e nirūhā-ye enǧelāb), a council of some older and very influential leaders of the conservative alliance.

Rejected candidates
Reformists
Akbar A'lami, Majlis representative of Tabriz.
Ebrahim Asgharzadeh, former member of Tehran city council, Secretary General of Islamic Iran Solidarity Party (Hezb-e Hambastegi-e Irān-e Eslāmi), and one of the hostage-takers in Iran hostage crisis. Asgharzadeh was even not supported by his own party (Islamic Iran Solidarity Party). Asgharzadeh was rejected by the Guardian Council to run as a candidate in the 2001 presidential elections, which had made him unlikely to be approved this time.
Mostafa Kavakebian, secretary-general of Democracy Party (hezb-e mardomsālāri). Kavakebian supported Karroubi after he himself was rejected.
Conservatives
Zabihollah Bakhshi, commonly known as Haji Bakhshi, militia leader
Rafat Bayat, Majlis representative from Zanjan, a member of conservative caucus in parliament. On 30 March, she stated that she would run independently, not supported by any significant party in the conservative alliance. It was assumed by some people that she would probably get rejected by the Guardian Council, because of the rejāl requirement (see above).
Reza Zavare'i, former member of Guardian Council, invited to run by Chekaad-e Daaneshjooyaan-e Mosalmaan
Independents
Nasser Hejazi, former goalkeeper of the national football team and former coach of the Esteghlal football club. After his rejection, Hejazi supported Hashemi Rafsanjani as president.
Mohammad Hossein Pahlevan, known as Arshia, pop singer
Azam Taleghani, daughter of Ayatollah Mahmoud Taleghani.
Ebrahim Yazdi, former Minister of Foreign affairs in the Interim Government of 1979, secretary general of Freedom Movement Party. After being rejected by the Guardian Council, Yazdi is supporting Moeen for the presidency.
Unknown affiliation
Ayatollah Mohammad Sajjadi

Declinations and withdrawals
The most important withdrawal was that of Mohsen Rezaee, one of the candidates who was approved by the Guardian Council and participated in the race until the evening of 15 June 2005, two days before the election and only a few hours before the final deadline allowed for advertisements. Rezaee mentioned he was withdrawing from the race for "the integration of the votes of the nation" and "their effectiveness". He did not endorse any candidate. 

Also, several people were considered possible candidates for the post, who later declined to run early in the race or at the final moments before registration. A list of the ones considered seriously in the media includes:
Reformists
Safdar Hosseini, Minister of Economy and Finance Affair, member of IIPF
Hadi Khamenei, member of Society of Forces Following the Line of the Imam, declined on 6 December 2004
Mohammad Reza Khatami, former Majlis Vice Speaker, Secretary General of IIPF
Hassan Khomeini, grandson of Ruhollah Khomeini
Mir-Hossein Mousavi, former Prime Minister, declined on 12 October 2004
Mohammad Mousavi-Khoiniha, member of MCS, declined on 21 November 2004
Behzad Nabavi, former Majlis Vice Speaker, member of MIRO
Mohammad Ali Najafi, former Minister of Education
Abdollah Ramezanzadeh, Spokesman of Government, member of IIPF
Conservatives
Gholam Ali Haddad-Adel, Speaker of Majlis, he declined his activities for election and said that he will try to re-ally conservatives for election.
Abdollah Jasbi, President of Islamic Azad University. Jasbi withdrew in favor of Hashemi Rafsanjani.
Mohammad Javad Larijani, Director of IPM. He strongly endorses his brother Ali Larijani for presidency.
Hossein Mirmohammad-Sadeghi, former speaker of Judiciary Branch
Ahmad Tavakkoli, Majlis representative and Director of Majlis Research Center and former presidential candidate. Tavakkoli resigned from the race on 1 May 2005, telling that he is doing this to help minimize the diversity in the conservative camp. He is supporting Ghalibaf in the elections.
Ali Akbar Velayati, an Adviser to the Supreme Leader for foreign affairs, and a former Minister of Foreign Affairs. Velayati was supported inside the conservative alliance by Islamic Coalition Party (ICP). Valayati had confirmed that he does not accept the support of the Council for Coordination and will run independently, unless Akbar Hashemi Rafsanjani, who was the President of Iran during Velayati's ministership, runs. On 14 May, Velayati did not register to run until the official deadline, and then announced that he is supporting Rafsanjani in the elections.
Independents
Shirin Ebadi, winner of Nobel Peace Prize in 2003, declined on 2 January 2005, despite support among some independent groups and parties, which are usually called pro-Human rights

General election

Campaign

The best financed candidate, Rafsanjani, campaigned with an entourage of bullet-proof Mercedes limousines. While he usually did not emphasize issues in his campaign Rafsanjani did tell voters that "there is no use imposing tastes, being strict, and going backward. ... Whoever becomes president cannot work without considering the demands and conditions of society." He also indicated a liberalizing in his views on proper Islamic dress. Where in 2002 he had said that exposing a single strand of a woman's hair from behind hejab was "a dagger drawn toward the heart of Islam," in 2005 he described his red line as "no nudity," in a campaign meeting with Iranian youth.

Ahmadinejad used mosque networks and his personal ties to the Revolutionary Guards and Basij for his campaign. In TV advertisements he was shown praying and praising veterans of the Iran–Iraq War for their sacrifices. He campaigned in an old 1977 Peugeot 504 car.

Endorsements
First round

Polling

Results 

The first round of the election was a very close race with minor differences in the number of votes won by each candidate which led to a run-off a week later with Ahmadinejad and ex-president Akbar Hashemi Rafsanjani participating. There were seven people running for the post out of more than a thousand initial candidates, most of whom were disqualified by the Guardian Council, which is responsible for vetting by constitution for election. Rafsanjani, who had been regarded as the front-runner and had positioned himself as a centrist, was defeated by Ahmadinejad in the run-off, while reformist candidate Mostafa Moeen fared poorly and finished only fifth in the first round.

This was the first presidential runoff in the history of Iran. Before the run-off took place, it was compared to the 2002 French presidential election, where the splintering of the left-wing vote similarly led to a run-off between the moderate Jacques Chirac and the far-right Jean-Marie Le Pen. The comparison was made because of the unexpected votes in favor of Ahmadinejad, the very close race, and the comparability of the political standings of Rafsanjani and Ahmadinejad to those of Chirac and Le Pen. But after the results for the run-off were made public, the comparison was considered void due to the loss of the moderate candidate Rafsanjani, although Ahmadinejad's opponents formed an alliance against him.

There was a total of 27,959,253 votes in the second round, slightly lower than the first round. Considering that the number of eligible votes was raised by about 150,000 people, the turnout was about 59.6%.

The tabulated results follow:

|-
! style="background-color:#E9E9E9;text-align:center;" rowspan=2|Candidate
! style="background-color:#E9E9E9;text-align:center;" colspan=2|1st round
! style="background-color:#E9E9E9;text-align:center;" colspan=2|2nd round
|-
! style="background-color:#E9E9E9;text-align:right;" |Votes 
! style="background-color:#E9E9E9;text-align:right;" |%
! style="background-color:#E9E9E9;text-align:right;" |Votes 
! style="background-color:#E9E9E9;text-align:right;" |%
|-
| style="text-align:left;" |Mahmoud Ahmadinejad
| style="text-align:right;" | 5,711,696
| style="text-align:right;" | 19.43
| style="text-align:right;" | 17,284,782
| style="text-align:right;" | 61.69
|-
| style="text-align:left;" |Akbar Hashemi Rafsanjani
| style="text-align:right;" | 6,211,937
| style="text-align:right;" | 21.13
| style="text-align:right;" | 10,046,701
| style="text-align:right;" | 35.93
|-
| style="text-align:left;" |Mehdi Karroubi
| style="text-align:right;" | 5,070,114
| style="text-align:right;" | 17.24
| style="text-align:right;background-color:#F4F4F4" colspan=2 rowspan=5|
|-
| style="text-align:left;" |Mohammad Bagher Ghalibaf
| style="text-align:right;" | 4,095,827
| style="text-align:right;" | 13.93
|-
| style="text-align:left;" |Mostafa Moeen
| style="text-align:right;" | 4,083,951
| style="text-align:right;" | 13.89
|-
| style="text-align:left;" |Ali Larijani
| style="text-align:right;" | 1,713,810
| style="text-align:right;" | 5.83
|-
| style="text-align:left;" |Mohsen Mehralizadeh
| style="text-align:right;" | 1,288,640
| style="text-align:right;" | 4.38
|-
| style="text-align:left;" | Blank or invalid votes
| style="text-align:right;" | 1,224,882
| style="text-align:right;" | 4.17
| style="text-align:right;" | 663,770
| style="text-align:right;" | 2.37
|-
|style="text-align:left;background-color:#E9E9E9"|Total (turnout 62.66% and 59.6%)
|width="75" style="text-align:right;background-color:#E9E9E9"| 29,400,857
|width="30" style="text-align:right;background-color:#E9E9E9"|100
|width="75" style="text-align:right;background-color:#E9E9E9"| 27,959,253
|width="30" style="text-align:right;background-color:#E9E9E9"|100
|}

Results Per Province

First round
The results of the first round, per Province:

Turnout

The Islamic Republic government of Iran, especially the Supreme Leader and the higher offices, publicly considers the turnout of the voters, which was about 64% in the first round, to resemble the support of the population for the regime, while some voters consider voting for the candidates less aligned with the supreme leader as a vote against the current practices of the regime.

Also, some voters, including exiled citizens belonging to opposition political groups or monarchists (both living outside Iran), some parts of the intellectual community living in Iran, and even a few reformists, had boycotted the election as a symbol of not supporting the current regime and its practices. The boycotters' reasons included the massive rejection of registered candidates, that they believed that the role of the Iranian president is insignificant in the power structure and overshadowed by those of the supreme leader who is practically elected for life, and that they believed that all the candidates had already helped the regime in the oppression of its political opposition or would do so if elected. The most famous boycott leader was Akbar Ganji, imprisoned in Evin prison for his journalism and in a hunger strike.

While some members of the intellectual community in Iran supported the boycott, some key figures, residing inside Iran or exiled to Europe or North America, had asked their readers and the general population to vote in the election, reasoning that not voting in the election would result in the election of one of the three conservative candidates, who were all military people with a background in Islamic Revolutionary Guard Corps. The most famous supporters of voting in the intellectual community included Ebrahim Nabavi, Masoud Behnoud, and Khashayar Deyhimi. These people were mostly supporting Moeen as their preferred candidate who is considered to be the least aligned with Ayatollah Khamenei, but a few have also talked or written in support of Rafsanjani or Karroubi.

After the results of the first round, many of the supporters of the boycott are now supporting Hashemi Rafsanjani, and many of the supporters of the reformist candidates, including many supporters of Moeen, are doing the same. Islamic Iran Participation Front (IIPF) and Mojahedin of the Islamic Revolution Organization (MIRO), as the two main parties who supported Moeen, are included, with IIPF asking for "uniting against the rise of religious fascism" and MIRO telling about the rival "Führer-istic mindset". Moeen himself has mentioned that he will not personally vote in the second round, but that his supporters "should take the danger of fascism seriously" and should not think about a boycott in the second round.

Also, Emadeddin Baghi, the President of the Iranian Association for Supporting Prisoners' Rights and one of the boycotters, has also spoken in support of Rafsanjani and mentioned that while he still considers Rafsanjani a conservative, he prefers his traditional conservatism to Ahmadinejad's fundamentalism.

Comparative to other elections, there does not seem to be any major drop in number of votes caused by boycott. The turnout in the previous election, i.e. Khatami's second term, was at 67%.

Election controversies
After the first round of the election, some people, including Mehdi Karroubi, the pragmatic reformist candidate who ranked third in the first round but was the first when partial results were first published, have alleged that a network of mosques, the Islamic Revolutionary Guard Corps military forces, and Basij militia forces have been illegally used to generate and mobilize support for Ahmadinejad. Karroubi has explicitly alleged that Mojtaba Khamenei, a son of the Supreme Leader Ayatollah Khamenei, was involved. Ayatollah Khamenei then wrote to Karroubi and mentioned that these allegations are below his dignity and will result in a crisis in Iran, which he will not allow. As a reply, Karroubi resigned from all his political posts, including an Advisor to the Supreme Leader and a member of Expediency Discernment Council, on both of which he had been installed by Khamenei. The day after, on 20 June, a few reformist morning newspapers, Eghbal, Hayat-e No, Aftab-e Yazd, and Etemaad were stopped from distribution by the general prosecutor of Tehran, Saeed Mortazavi, for publishing Karroubi's letter.

Akbar Hashemi Rafsanjani, the leading candidate, has also pointed to organized and unjust interventions by "guiding" the votes, and has supported Karroubi's complaint.

A suspicious election result pointed out by Western journalist Christopher de Bellaigue was a 95% voter turnout and first-place result for Ahmadinejad in the province of South Khorasan. This despite that region's large numbers of disgruntled Sunni Muslims, and Ahmadinejad's association with "intrusive Shia Islamism."

Also, some political groups, including the reformist party Islamic Iran Participation Front, have alleged that Ahmadinejad had only ranked second because of the illegal support and advertising activities for him during the voting by the supervisors selected by the Guardian Council, while the supervisors should have remained impartisan according to the election law. Also, the reformist newspaper Shargh has pointed to an announcement by Movahhedi Kermani, the official representative of the supreme leader in Islamic Revolutionary Guards Corps, mentioning "vote for a person who keeps to the minimum in his advertisements and doesn't lavish", which uniquely pointed to Ahmadinejad.

Some of the controversies involve activities of the Guardian Council such as the publishing an opinion poll before the election giving Ahmadinejad front-runner status. It also announced the partial results of the election on the day after the election, putting Ahmadinejad on the second rank while he was still in the third rank in the partial statistics published by the Ministry of Interior, which led to President Khatami going to the Ministry several times and explicitly asking the council to not announce any more partial results.

References

External links
 Guide to Iran's presidential polls, from BBC News
 Angus Reid Consultants - Election Tracker
 The text of the Iranian law for presidential elections (in Persian)
 ISNA report on Mousavi's declination, reported by Karroubi (in Persian)
 Situation on 6 December (in Persian)
 Run off results from the BBC
 Electoral Geography of Iranian presidential election, 2005
 Iran newspaper on the elections atmosphere after Mousavi'e declination (in Persian)

2005
2005 elections in Iran
June 2005 events in Asia